Vibrations is  an album by jazz group The Three Sounds featuring performances recorded in 1966 and released on the Blue Note label.

Reception
The Allmusic review by Stephen Thomas Erlewine awarded the album 3 stars stating "Vibrations doesn't make the first rank of Three Sounds records because the performances are a little stiff, and the infrequent organ sounds a little awkward. There are certainly plenty of good things here -- and there are more good than bad things -- but Vibrations primarily offers the kind of pleasures that are only meaningful to dedicated fans".

Track listing
 "The Frown" (Gene Harris) - 3:29
 "Fever" (Eddie Cooley, Davenport) - 2:36
 "Let's Go Get Stoned" (Joey Armstead, Ashford, Simpson) - 3:13
 "Something You Got" (Chris Kenner) - 2:36
 "Yeh Yeh" (Grant, Hendricks, Patrick) - 3:54
 "It Was a Very Good Year" (Drake) - 2:44
 "The Lamp Is Low" (de Rose, Parish, Ravel, Shefter) - 5:05
 "Yours Is My Heart Alone" (Lehár, Löhner) - 4:02
 "Django" (Lewis) - 5:30
 "Charade" (Mancini, Mercer) - 4:04

Personnel
Gene Harris - piano, organ
Andrew Simpkins - bass
Kalil Madi - drums

References

Blue Note Records albums
The Three Sounds albums
1967 albums
Albums recorded at Van Gelder Studio